Zygmuntów is a part of the village of Omięcin, located in Masovian Voivodeship, Poland, in the municipality of Szydłowiec, Szydłowiec County.

History 
Zygmuntów was officially given the status of the town in 1775, and lost it around 1808. Currently, it is a part of the village of Omięcin, located in Masovian Voivodeship, Poland.

Citations

Notes

References 

Villages in Szydłowiec County
Former towns